Hugh Hossick Mackay Bridgman (1 February 1890 – 3 December 1953) was an Australian cricketer. He played ten first-class matches for South Australia between 1912 and 1923.

In addition to representing South Australia in cricket Bridgman was active in cricket administration serving as a South Australian selector from at least 1922, and he went on to become a member of the Board of Control and a committeeman of the South Australian Cricket Association after his playing career.

See also
 List of South Australian representative cricketers

References

External links
 

1890 births
1953 deaths
Australian cricketers
South Australia cricketers
Cricketers from Adelaide